Guro Valen (20 March 1960 – 26 September 2014) was a Norwegian professor of medicine.

She was a daughter of political scientist Henry Valen. She worked at the University of Tromsø, Karolinska Institutet and the University of Oslo, and was a fellow of the Norwegian Academy of Science and Letters. She died from cancer in September 2014.

References

1960 births
2014 deaths
20th-century Norwegian physicians
Norwegian expatriates in Sweden
Academic staff of the University of Tromsø
Academic staff of the Karolinska Institute
Academic staff of the University of Oslo
Members of the Norwegian Academy of Science and Letters
Norwegian women physicians
21st-century Norwegian physicians